The Saline River, also known as Saline Creek, is a  tributary of the Ouachita River in the south central portion of the U.S. state of Arkansas. It is the longest river that flows entirely within the state of Arkansas.

The Saline River begins in the eastern foothills of the Ouachita Mountains in Saline and Garland counties. The river has four headwater tributaries, the South Fork, the Middle Fork, the Alum Fork, and the North Fork, which merge northwest of the city of Benton.

The upper section of the Saline is a clear, cold-water stream with a series of fast running shoals interspersed with quiet pools. The central section of the river has clear to murky water with long slower moving pools interrupted by short stretches of fast water. The lower section is sluggish with murky water. The L'Aigle Creek (Saline River of the Ouachita River) connects to the Saline River near where the Saline River connects to the Ouachita River.  During parts of the year the lower stretches of the river can be somewhat clogged with brush or trees.

After the merge of the three forks the river flattens and travels through Grant, Cleveland, Bradley, and Ashley counties.

The river reaches its confluence with the Ouachita River in the marshy area north of Lake Jack Lee within the Felsenthal National Wildlife Refuge.

The Saline is relatively free of development. The river runs through dense forests which are home to bear, deer, mink, otters, beaver, muskrats, turkey, squirrel as well as alligators in southern sections of the river.  The river provides excellent fishing, scenery, and wilderness floating.

Smallmouth, largemouth, rock bass, and spotted bass as well as warmouth, longear, green sunfish, bluegills, channel catfish, and crappie inhabit the river.

Picnicking and swimming facilities are available at Jenkins' Ferry Historical Monument south of Sheridan which commemorates the Battle of Jenkins' Ferry during the American Civil War.

History

Steamboats
In the days of the steamboats, the steamboats traveled upstream as far as Bridges Bluff in Cleveland County. Cotton, timber, and staves (to make wood barrels) were shipped downstream each winter and spring (while the river water was high) to New Orleans and Monroe, Louisiana. Fifty-four steamboats have been documented on the Saline River.

Carrie Poole, steamboat

Enos Taylor, steamboat

Handy, steamboat

The Morgan Nelson, steamboat

Steamboat traffic on the Saline river was considerably reduced with the arrival of the rail system in 1880. One of the last steamboats on the Saline River was the Gate City, which sank on October 14, 1913, near Warren.

Flood of 1927

The Great Mississippi Flood of 1927 flooded the areas along the Saline and Ouachita Rivers.

See also
List of rivers of Arkansas

References

Rivers of Arkansas
Tributaries of the Red River of the South
Rivers of Saline County, Arkansas
Rivers of Garland County, Arkansas
Rivers of Grant County, Arkansas
Rivers of Cleveland County, Arkansas
Rivers of Bradley County, Arkansas
Rivers of Ashley County, Arkansas
Ouachita River